Paisley West railway station was a railway station in Paisley, Renfrewshire, Scotland. The station was originally part of the Paisley Canal Line.

History
The station opened on 1 June 1897, and closed 14 February 1966.

See also

References

Notes

Sources 
 
 
Google satellite image and photographs

Disused railway stations in Renfrewshire
Beeching closures in Scotland
Former Glasgow and South Western Railway stations
Railway stations in Great Britain opened in 1897
Railway stations in Great Britain closed in 1966
Buildings and structures in Paisley, Renfrewshire
Transport in Paisley, Renfrewshire
1897 establishments in Scotland
1967 disestablishments in Scotland